Auto Shankar is an Indian crime thriller streaming television series released on ZEE5, in the setting of Madras from 1985 to 1995. The story revolves around an auto driver whose life changes when he gets involved in the local transportation of liquor and prostitution. The series stars Appani Sarath as the real-life eponymous criminal.

Premise
The series focuses on a gangster nicknamed "Auto Shankar". He slowly becomes more involved in his illegal trade, and spirals out of control, becoming connected to various businessmen and politicians. He is called a serial killer by police. The show ends with him being charged with the death penalty.

Cast 
Source
Appani Sarath as Gowri Shankar / Auto Shankar 
Vasudha as Lalitha
Saranya Ravi as Sumathi
Selvapandian as Mohan
Swayam Siddha as Chandrika
Arjun Chidambaram as Kathiravan
Rajesh Dev as Babu

Episodes

References

External links 

Auto Shankar on ZEE5

ZEE5 original programming
Tamil-language web series
Tamil-language crime television series
Tamil-language thriller television series
2019 Tamil-language television series debuts
2019 Tamil-language television series endings